The 2011 British Superbike season was the 24th British Superbike Championship season. No major rules were changed from the previous year with the showdown section of the season staying and the continuation of the evolution class below the main superbike class. The field had greater quality than the year before with champion Ryuichi Kiyonari returning to defend his title on the HM Plant Honda alongside the returning former British superbike champion Shane Byrne. This meant that Josh Brookes moved onto the lone Relentless by TAS Suzuki, with Michael Laverty and Tommy Hill moving to a new swan Yamaha team. The major signing was that of former Moto GP rider John Hopkins who joined the Samsung crescent Suzuki squad alongside Jon Kirkham.

The championship was tightly contested between Byrne, Hopkins and Hill, each taking their share of race wins, but it was not until the final round at Brands Hatch that the title would be decided. The first race was edgy with Michael Laverty taking the victory, the second race of the weekend would however swing the title towards Tommy Hill, Hopkin's Samsung Suzuki cut out in the early laps forcing him to restart the bikes electronics and ride from the back of the field to 12th place. It was all down to the final race, whoever finished first between Hopkins and Hill would win the title. Hopkins made a good start and lead Hill for almost the entire race, however on the penultimate lap Hill would pass Hopkins, leaving it until the final corner of the final lap Hopkins went up the inside to retake second however he could not hold the line and Hill squeezed up the inside to beat Hopkins to the title by 6 thousandths of a second (0.006s) to become the 2011 British Superbike Champion.

Calendar

Notes:
1. – The second race at Oulton Park was cancelled due to bad weather conditions. As a result, the race was run at the next possible round of the championship at Cadwell Park, with the second race grid positions standing for the race.

Entry List

Championship standings

Riders' Championship

Evolution Championship

Manufacturers' Championship

References

External links
 The official website of the British Superbike Championship

British
British Superbike Championship
Superbike